Neohermes californicus is a species of fishfly in the family Corydalidae. It is found in North America.

References

 Flint, Oliver S. Jr. (1965). "The genus Neohermes (Megaloptera: Corydalidae)". Psyche, vol. 72, no. 3, 255-263.
 Penny, Norman D., Philip A. Adams, and Lionel A. Stange (1997). "Species catalog of the Neuroptera, Megaloptera, and Raphidioptera of America North of Mexico". Proceedings of the California Academy of Sciences, vol. 50, no. 3, 39-114.

Further reading

 

Corydalidae
Insects described in 1853